Salamatu Hussaini Suleiman is a Nigerian lawyer who currently serves as the ECOWAS Commissioner for Political Affairs, Peace and Security. Prior to this, she was appointed Minister of Women Affairs and Social Development in December 2008.
She left office in March 2010 when Acting President Goodluck Jonathan dissolved his cabinet.

Background

Salamatu Hussaini Suleiman was born in Argungu, a fishing community in Kebbi State. Her father was an area court judge, and her mother came from the Gwandu royal family.
She was brought up in Birnin Kebbi and Argungu. In 1972, she obtained entry to Queens College, Lagos. She went on to Ahmadu Bello University, Zaria where she obtained a degree in law. She then went to the London School of Economics and Political Science where she gained a master's degree in law.

Career 
Her first job as a lawyer was with the Ministry of Justice in the old Sokoto State. She then worked at Continental Merchant Bank, Lagos for seven years, and worked for a short time at NAL Merchant Bank before moving to Aluminum Smelter Company, where she was company secretary/legal adviser. After that, she worked at the Securities and Exchange Commission before being appointed Minister.

Minister for Women Affairs
President Umaru Yar'Adua appointed Suleiman as Minister for Women Affairs and Social Development on 17 December 2008. In September 2009, Suleiman decried marginalization of women in Nigerian politics.
She said that violence and male chauvinism were prevalent in the political climate, and coupled with lack of money few women were able to contest for public office.
At meetings in October 2009 organized by UNICEF and the Ministry of Women Affairs and Social Development, Suleiman said her mission was to serve as the national vehicle for speedy and healthy development of Nigerian women, and to ensure the protection and development of women and children for meaningful life. She urged the state to give women at least 30% representation in elective and appointive positions.
In December 2009, she decried the failure of the government to ratify the United Nations Convention on the Elimination of All Forms of Discrimination Against Women (CEDAW).

See also 
 Nigerian Ministry of Women Affairs
She was also Honourable Minister of state II Foreign Affairs - Nigeria, 2010 to 2011

References 

Federal ministers of Nigeria
Living people
Nigerian Muslims
People from Kebbi State
Ahmadu Bello University alumni
Women's ministers
Nigerian women lawyers
21st-century Nigerian politicians
21st-century Nigerian women politicians
Women government ministers of Nigeria
Year of birth missing (living people)